Kvartal 95 Studio (Ukrainian: Сту́дія «Кварта́л-95»; Russian: Сту́дия «Кварта́л-95») is a publicly held television entertainment production company operating in Ukraine since 2003. The company was founded by now-President of Ukraine Volodymyr Zelenskyy and some of his school friends. The company produces audio and visual content (such as films, TV series and formats) in Russian and Ukrainian, and organises concerts.

History
Kvartal 95 Studio was founded in 2003 on the basis of the KVN team Kvartal 95, which, in turn, is named after the 95th Kvartal, a neighborhood in Kryvyi Rih. Kvartal 95 KVN team was founded in 1997 while its official debut took place in 1998 at the KVN festival in Sochi. The studio as well as the KVN team was created by Volodymyr Zelenskyy, who ran in the 2019 Ukrainian presidential election, and was elected President of Ukraine. 

According to Zelenskyy, the objective of the company is to "make the world a better place, a kinder and more joyful place with the help of those tools that we have, which are humor and creativity". It has produced such popular (in Ukraine) shows as Vechirniy Kvartal (English: Evening Neighbourhood), Svaty (The In-Laws), and Servant of the People.

Since the presidency of Volodymyr Zelenskyy 
After Zelenskyy's inauguration most leading figures of Kvartal 95 joined Zelenskyy's administration as Deputy Heads of the Presidential Administration of Ukraine and one was appointed Deputy Head of the Ukrainian Secret Service.

References 

Television studios in Ukraine
Volodymyr Zelenskyy
Companies based in Kyiv
Ukrainian companies established in 2003
Ukrainian comedy
Comedy troupes
Kryvyi Rih
Entertainment companies established in 2003
Ukrainian film studios